The Summit on Responsible Artificial Intelligence in the Military Domain, also known as REAIM 2023, was a diplomatic conference held in 2023 regarding military uses of artificial intelligence. It was held in the World Forum in The Hague on 15–16 February 2023.

The summit concluded with the production of a "call to action" document, endorsed by representatives from 60 countries.

References 

Diplomatic conferences
Artificial intelligence